Church of Santa Catalina may refer to:

Church of Santa Catalina (Caudete)
Church of Santa Catalina (El Bonillo)
Church of Santa Catalina (Sevilla)

See also
Church of Santa Catarina (Calheta)